The Last Adventure is a 1967 French-Italian adventure drama film directed by Robert Enrico and based on a novel by José Giovanni. A tale of adventure, two handsome men, Alain Delon and Lino Ventura, with a good-looking girl, Joanna Shimkus, escape setbacks in France to go in search of sunken treasure off the coast of Africa. But finding the loot only brings them new and more deadly challenges.

Synopsis
Outside Paris, three people are pursuing their separate dreams. Roland is building his own racing car, but it blows up under test. His friend Manu is a stunt pilot, who loses his licence. They are befriended by Laetitia, an artist mounting her first exhibition, at which not a single work sells.

Their dreams in ruins, and virtually broke, the three pool what's left of their resources and head for a place on the African coast where an aircraft full of loot came down in the sea. As they are searching for the wreck, a man climbs aboard their boat and says he was the pilot. He helps them find the sunken plane, but after hauling up the treasure their boat is approached by men claiming to be police. In fact, they are mercenaries who plan to seize the treasure. A gun battle follows, in which the mercenaries are repelled but Laetitia is killed.  Roland and Manu put Letitia's body into a deep sea diving suit, and bury her at sea.

Roland and Manu put the pilot ashore and head back to France with their booty. Finding Laetitia's young cousin, they give him her share of the proceeds. Roland then decides to fulfil her last dream, which was to create a smart hotel and restaurant out of an abandoned sea fort. Manu decides to look up old friends in Paris, where he is spotted by the mercenaries who have been keeping watch on his former girl friend's apartment. Evading them, he rushes to warn Roland in the fort. The mercenaries follow, and in a gun battle Manu is killed. Using a cache of hand grenades left by the Germans in 1945, Roland is able to kill the remaining mercenaries.

Cast
 Lino Ventura as Roland Darbant
 Alain Delon as Manu Borelli
 Joanna Shimkus as Laetitia Weiss
 Serge Reggiani as pilot
 Hans Meyer as mercenary
 Valéry Inkijinoff

Production
The film is partly shot on Fort Boyard, which becomes the stage of the final showdown.

Reception

France
The film was popular at the French box office, being one of Delon's biggest hits of the 1960s.

United States
The movie was released in the US in 1969. The Los Angeles Times called the film "a rather formless and old fashioned display of sentimental heroics." However, The New York Times liked the film, saying it:
Has a surprise around every bend. Tightened and aimed a little more purposefully, this attractive French drama of two adventurer-pals and their lovely tag-along comrade, might have hit the jackpot. What it does have, under Robert Enrico's imaginative direction, is spontaneous flow, striking pictorial sweep and three people who become more credible and persuasive as the picture moves along... It is beautifully handled, with some superb color photography underwater and on shore, and a consistent air of fresh reality. Furthermore, Mr. Delon, Mr. Ventura and the delicious Miss Shimkus (the heroine of Mr. Enrico's "Zita") are interesting, likable and real.

Spiritual successor and remakes
The movie only used the first half of the novel's plot. The second half was actually adapted into the film Law of Survival (1967) (La loi du survivant), starring Michel Constantin.

The film was remade in Japan in 1974 as The Homeless, starring Meiko Kaji.

In 2014 a second remake was made in Russia, titled The Adventurers which starred Konstantin Khabensky.

Legacy
Excerpts of the film were used for the 2015 Christian Dior's "Eau Sauvage" cologne advertising campaign drawing on the legacy of Alain Delon.

References

External links
 
 Review of film in New York Times
 Joe Dante on The Last Adventure at Trailers from Hell

1960s adventure drama films
1960s buddy films
1967 films
Italian aviation films
Films based on French novels
Films based on works by José Giovanni
Films directed by Robert Enrico
Films scored by François de Roubaix
Films set in the Democratic Republic of the Congo
French adventure drama films
1960s French-language films
Italian buddy films
Films with screenplays by José Giovanni
Seafaring films
Treasure hunt films
Underwater action films
French aviation films
1967 drama films
1960s Italian films
1960s French films